The Winter Street Historic District is a historic district on Winter Street in Cambridge, Massachusetts.  Centered on the junction of Winter Street with Sciarappa Street, the district includes sixteen houses, fourteen of which were worker's cottages built before 1854.  Many early residents of the area were employed by the New England Glass Company, whose factory was nearby.  The district is the best-preserved streetscape of such worker housing in East Cambridge.

The district was listed on the National Register of Historic Places in 1982.

See also
National Register of Historic Places listings in Cambridge, Massachusetts

References

Historic districts in Middlesex County, Massachusetts
National Register of Historic Places in Cambridge, Massachusetts
Historic districts on the National Register of Historic Places in Massachusetts